Adebimpe Oyebade  (born 23 March 1992) better known as Mo Bimpe is a Nigerian film actress known for winning the 2018 City People Entertainment Awards for Best New Actress of the Year.

Early life
Oyebade Adebimpe was born on 23 March 1992 and a native of Ijero in Ekiti State.

Filmography
Omo Oba (2019)
The Cokers (2021)
That One Time (2022)
Secret
Assurance
The Fault
Oloore
Romance
Entrapped
Tranquillity
Dear Sister
Shadows
Irapada

Personal life
Adebimpe married Lateef Adedimeji in December 2021.

References

External links

Living people
1997 births
Yoruba actresses
Nigerian film actresses
Nigerian film award winners
Nigerian film producers
People from Ekiti State
Nigerian women film producers